Boyd's Shop, at 227 1st. St. W. in Kalispell in Flathead County, Montana, was built around 1910 to 1915.  It was listed on the National Register of Historic Places in 1994.

It was established as a blacksmith shop, and was later shifted to welding.

It has Western false front architecture.

The site was part of Kalispell's Chinatown in the 1890s.  A steam laundry plus a Chinese laundry and dwellings were on the lot in 1892;  all buildings on the lot were burned or demolished before 1910.

References

Commercial buildings on the National Register of Historic Places in Montana
Commercial buildings completed in 1913
National Register of Historic Places in Flathead County, Montana
1913 establishments in Montana
Blacksmith shops
Western false front architecture